Omarska (Cyrillic: Омарска) is a small town near Prijedor in northwestern Bosnia and Herzegovina. The town includes an old iron mine and ore processing plant. During the Bosnian War it was the site of the Omarska concentration camp.

History

World War II
During World War II, a massacre of Bosnian Serb civilians occurred in Omarska by the Ustaše.

Bosnian War
The Omarska camp was a concentration camp run by Bosnian Serb forces in Omarska, set up for Bosniak and Croat men and women during the Prijedor massacre. Functioning in the first months of the Bosnian War in 1992, it was one of 677 alleged detention centers and camps set up throughout Bosnia and Herzegovina during the war. While nominally an "investigation center" or "assembly point" for members of the non-Serb population, Human Rights Watch classified Omarska as a concentration camp.

Geography

Main Features

The municipal commonwealth of Omarska consists of Omarska town and 10 villages: Petrov Gaj, Kevljani, Lamovita, Bistrica, Verići, Niševići, Gradina, Jelićka, Krivaja and Marićka. Its geographical coordinates are 44°53'22.00"N 16°53'43.23"E. It has area of 246.73 km² and it is located 169m above sea level. The average temperature (over the year) is +12 degrees celsius. The average yearly rain level is 1200mm. The terrain of Omarska is mainly plains, 65% lowlands and 35% highlands.

Hydrography

The river system in Omarska is extensive. Through the middle of Omarska territory runs the river Gomjenica, which has great agricultural significance locally, because it runs through the most fertile land in this area. Gomjenica is a confluent of Sana. The river joins Sana in Prijedor.

Demographic Features

Population

According to the 1971 Yugoslav census, the population of Omarska was 19,044 - of which 16,084 were Serbs, 2,198 were Muslims, 376 were Croats and 433 were others. The average population density of the town was 68 per km².

Education

There is one elementary school in Omarska, OŠ "Vuk Karadžić", which has about 800 pupils. Children from Omarska usually go to high schools in Prijedor or Banjaluka.

Sports
Omarska has a football club, FK Omarska, which competes in the 2nd League-West of the Republika Srpska. *Željko Buvač was born here, ex footballer, now assistant manager of Liverpool FC.

Gallery

References

External links

 http://www.omarska.net, local site & forum
 http://eko-omarska.org, local environmental movement's site

Cities and towns in Republika Srpska
Prijedor